Isabel Keating is an American actress and singer. She is known for her performance as Judy Garland in the original Broadway production of The Boy from Oz, which earned her a Tony Award nomination and a Drama Desk Award.

Career

Broadway
Keating made her Broadway debut in 2003, in Enchanted April. She replaced Molly Ringwald in the role of Rose Arnott after having created the leading role of Lotty Wilton in the play's world-premiere production at Hartford Stage Company in Hartford, Connecticut.

Keating is widely acclaimed for her portrayal of Judy Garland in the 2003 Broadway production of The Boy From Oz, in which she starred opposite Hugh Jackman (who played Peter Allen). For her performance she received a Tony Award nomination and won a Drama Desk Award and Theatre World Award.

She joined the Broadway cast of Hairspray, directed by Jack O'Brien, in the role of Velma Von Tussle in June 2006 and stayed with the production through August 2007.

Keating played Peter Parker's Aunt May and other characters in the Broadway production of Spider-Man: Turn Off the Dark, directed by Julie Taymor.

From 2014 to 2015, Keating appeared on Broadway in Terrence McNally's hit comedy It's Only a Play, directed by Jack O'Brien.

She played Madame Morrible in Wicked on Broadway from January through November 2018 after performing the same role in the U.S. National Tour.

Other theatre
Keating has performed at Theatre Previews at Duke, where she starred in Gore Vidal's On the March to the Sea opposite Chris Noth, Charles Durning, Richard Easton, Michael Learned and Harris Yulin; at the Long Wharf Theater in New Haven, Connecticut, in Tom Stoppard's Travesties opposite Sam Waterston; and at the Paper Mill Playhouse, in Millburn, New Jersey, in Wendy Kesselman's stage version of The Diary of Anne Frank.

She won the 2000 Helen Hayes Award for Best Actress for her performance in Tom Stoppard's play Indian Ink at the Studio Theatre in Washington, D.C.

Keating appeared as Vi in Lucinda Coxon's Waiting at the Water's Edge in its American premiere, directed by Nela Wagman for the Watermark Theatre Company, and played the Duchess of Berwick in the Oscar Wilde comedy Lady Windermere's Fan directed by Moisés Kaufman in 2005 at the Williamstown Theatre Festival in Williamstown, Massachusetts.

Film and television
Keating co-starred in Indignation—James Schamus's feature film directorial début, based on Philip Roth's novel—opposite Logan Lerman and Sarah Gadon. The film premiered at the Sundance Film Festival in January 2016 and was theatrically released on July 29, 2016.

She has guest-starred in episodes of 3 lbs (2006), Law & Order: Criminal Intent (2008), The Path (2016), and New Amsterdam (2021) and appeared in films including The Nanny Diaries and The Life Before Her Eyes.

Acting credits

Theatre

Film and television

Awards and nominations

References

External links
Isabel Keating homepage

Isabel Keating Interview by Beth Stevens on Broadway.com

Actresses from Georgia (U.S. state)
Actresses from New York (state)
American film actresses
American musical theatre actresses
American stage actresses
American television actresses
Drama Desk Award winners
Living people
Actors from Savannah, Georgia
Musicians from Savannah, Georgia
Theatre World Award winners
Year of birth missing (living people)
21st-century American women